Talveda is a village in Nizamabad district of the Indian state Telangana. It is located in Nandipet mandal of the district.

History
Talvedha is the very large village in Nadipet Mandel with the population of 7150 as per the 2008 census. The population is proportion is 55% male and 45% female. Talvedha has an average literacy rate of 68%, higher than the Mandel average of 58%.

Talvedha is one among those villages in Nandipet Mandal that were affected by the construction of the Pochampad Dam. The government of Andhra Pradesh wanted to relocate Talveda at the borders of Nizamabad and Adilabad districts after the village was submerged under water of Pochampad Dam. The people of Talveda didn't want to move that far away and constructed the same village only one kilometer away from the old Talveda Village.

It has one of the best cricket teams in the Mandala, which often falls in top 5 teams, most of the times it remains at first or second position.

Most of the People converting to devotees of Lord Krishna and Shirdi Saibaba. once in a year villagers are going to visit Brundavanam where lord Krishna was grown up.

Every year the villagers celebrate Katharina on the day of Sri Ramanavami festival and also offered anna prasadam by the village committee.

Gallery

References

External links

Villages in Nizamabad district